Colonel Sir Peter Hilton,  (30 June 1919 – 30 May 1995) was a senior officer in the British Army and a businessman.

Early life and career
A son of Major General Richard Hilton and Phyllis Hilton, he was educated at Malvern College. He was born into a County Durham family whose country home was Hylton Castle, near Sunderland. He later entered the Royal Military Academy, Woolwich, from where he received a commission as a second lieutenant in the Royal Artillery on 26 January 1939.

He served in the Second World War, joining the British Expeditionary Force (BEF) in 1939–1940. He was promoted to lieutenant on 1 January 1941. After being evacuated from Dunkirk, he served in the Western Desert with the 7th Armoured Division from 1942 to 1943, seeing action at El Alamein. He then joined the U. S. Fifth Army in Italy from 1943 to 1944, returning to join the Normandy invasion with the Royal Horse Artillery in 1944, where he was badly wounded.

He was sent to Greece as an instructor in 1950 but was recalled due to Korea. He was awarded the Military Cross and two bars and, in 1972, was made an honorary colonel. He became Lord Lieutenant of Derbyshire (1978–1994) and was created a Knight of the Order of St John on 18 December 1980.

After retiring from the Army, Sir Peter took over running his in-laws' nurseries at Tansley. He invested in Britannia Park, an ill-fated venture to build a theme park in Derbyshire. The company became bankrupt in 1985, only ten weeks after its opening, owing him £28,000. He was forced to sell his garden nursery business as a result.

Private life and honours
He married Lady Winifred Smith in 1942 and they had two sons, Andrew and Richard. On 12 June 1993, he was made a Knight Commander in the Royal Victorian Order in the Birthday Honours List. He died in 1995 and is buried at Idridgehay.

Sir Peter Hilton Court at the University of Derby is named in his honour.

References

1919 births
1995 deaths
People educated at Malvern College
Graduates of the Royal Military Academy, Woolwich
British Army personnel of World War II
Knights Commander of the Royal Victorian Order
Knights of the Order of St John
Recipients of the Military Cross
Lord-Lieutenants of Derbyshire
People associated with the University of Derby
Royal Artillery officers
British Army personnel of the Korean War
Military personnel from County Durham